McNulty is an unincorporated community in Columbia County, Oregon, United States. It was named for Columbia River steamboat captain John McNulty, a pioneer riverboatman of the Pacific Northwest.

References

Unincorporated communities in Columbia County, Oregon
Former census-designated places in Oregon
Unincorporated communities in Oregon